The year 1914 in architecture involved some significant events.

Events
 April 11 – Alpha Rho Chi, a professional architecture fraternity, is founded in the Hotel Sherman in Chicago, Illinois, United States.
 May 15–August 8 – Werkbund Exhibition in Cologne, featuring the Glass Pavilion designed by Bruno Taut.
 August 15 – A dismissed servant kills seven people at American architect Frank Lloyd Wright's studio and home, Taliesin in Wisconsin (including Wright's mistress, Mamah Borthwick), and sets it on fire.

Buildings and structures

Buildings and structures opened
 January 14 – "Bridge of Sighs" at Hertford College, Oxford, England, designed by Sir Thomas Jackson.
 April – Opera House, Wellington, New Zealand, designed by William Pitt.
 May 7 – King Edward VII Galleries at the British Museum, London, designed by Sir John Burnet.
 June 1 – Fairmont Palliser Hotel in Calgary, Alberta
 August 15 – The Panama Canal, completed by George Washington Goethals.
 December 7 – Tepid Baths, Auckland, New Zealand.

Buildings completed

 Basilica of Sacré-Cœur, Paris, designed by Paul Abadie.
 Berlin State Library, Berlin, designed by Ernst von Ihne 
 Casa Loma, Toronto, Ontario, Canada.
 Park Guell in Barcelona, Spain, designed by Antonio Gaudi.
 Stralsund Theatre, Germany, designed by Carl Moritz.
 Interior of Cadena Café, 59 Westbourne Grove, London, designed by Omega Workshops.
 US Post Office, Westerly, Rhode Island, designed by James Knox Taylor and considered "the finest post office in the state."

Awards
 AIA Gold Medal – Jean-Louis Pascal.
 RIBA Royal Gold Medal – Jean-Louis Pascal.
 Grand Prix de Rome, architecture: Albert Ferran.

Publications
 Albert Richardson – Monumental Classic Architecture in Great Britain and Ireland
 Geoffrey Scott – The Architecture of Humanism: a study in the history of taste

Births

 February 24 – Ralph Erskine, English architect working in Sweden (died 2005)
 July 8 – Sarah P. Harkness, American architect (died 2013)
 August 9 – Gordon Cullen, influential English architect and urban designer (died 1994)
 September 8 – Denys Lasdun, English architect best known for the Royal National Theatre, London (died 2001)
 September 13 – Ralph Rapson, American architect and head of architecture at the University of Minnesota (died 2008)
 October 31 – Edward Allcard, British architect and yachtsman (died 2017)
 December 5 – Lina Bo Bardi, Italian-born Brazilian modernist architect (died 1992)

Deaths
 February 8 – Francesc Berenguer i Mestres, Spanish architect (born 1866)
 May 24 – Herman Teodor Holmgren, Swedish architect (born 1842)
 August 30 – Ingress Bell, English architect and professional partner of Sir Aston Webb (born 1837)

References